Aeolos Rugby is the first rugby union team established in Patras, Greece and Peloponnisos in general. It is part of Aeolos Gymnastic Club.
The team has played its "home" matches in Haikali municipality stadium.

History

First Era (2010-11)

The team was founded in August 2010, by local people assisted by French who used to live in Patras.
Aeolos under Christophe Zapirain's directions, competed in 2010-11 for the 15s Greek National Championship and finished in 5th place.
Unfortunately in the summer of 2011 the team decided to pause all activities.

2013–present

In April 2013 few locals formed a Rugby team in Patras that was named Patras Rebels. After some months the team was merged with Aeolos Rugby.
Aeolos rugby in 2013-14 participated in Unity Cup and Unity 7's Cup of GRASS facing Athens Spartans RFC, Panathinaikos RFC, Attica Springboks RFC, Thessaloniki Lions RFC, Titanes Kavalas RFC, West Side United RFC. Despite being a newcomer Aeolos team managed to finish 3rd in the Unity Cup after a long challenging season. Alongside the 7s team of Aeolos secured the 3rd place in Unity 7s Cup, in which the players had the honor to meet and play with the Australian rugby legend, David Campese. 
Also in 2014 Aeolos 7s Rugby Women team was created that also took part in Unity 7s Cup.

Badge and colours

The club's badge is derived from the ruler of the winds in Greek mythology, Aeolus.
The Aeolos Rugby first strip in 2010 was black shirt with green sleeves, black shorts and green socks.
In 2013 when the team was merged with Patras Rebels the strip changed, now the shirt is white with green details, white shorts and green socks.

Grounds

Aeolos is using the municipality field of Agios Stefanos, which is located in between the villages of Agios Stefanos and Haikali.
In the summer of 2013 with the help of the local community of Agios Stefanos and Haikali municipality, the local Football field was renovated and the first exclusively Rugby field in Greece was created.

Sponsorship

The club's first shirt sponsors at the beginning of the 2010–11 season was Freyssinet and Jidet.
In 2014 Aeolos signed a deal with Zaharopoulos Basilios and Arkhon Panel became the golden sponsor of the team. Also Cherry's Cafe and The Mark are sponsoring the club.

Players
As of 1 October 2014

Seniors

(c) Denotes team captain, Bold denotes player has been internationally capped.

Women

(c) Denotes team captain.

Veterans

Citations and References

 
 :fr:Championnat de Grèce de rugby à XV#Clubs
 https://web.archive.org/web/20140208171052/http://www.panhellenicrugby.com/
 http://www.dete.gr/
 https://web.archive.org/web/20140325012240/http://achaiasports.gr/
 http://www.pelop.gr/default.aspx?page=home
 http://www.patrasevents.gr/
 http://www.patrasnews.com/
 https://web.archive.org/web/20140324201312/http://www.rugbyingreek.com/
 http://www.thebest.gr/
 http://www.markasport.gr/?section=995&language=el_GR
 https://web.archive.org/web/20140324201910/http://www.hellasrugby.gr/

External links
 Official website

Greek rugby union teams
Rugby clubs established in 2010